Elaphristis is a genus of moths of the family Erebidae. The genus was erected by Edward Meyrick in 1891.

Species
 Elaphristis aneliopa (Bethune-Baker, 1908)
 Elaphristis anthracia Meyrick, 1891
 Elaphristis anthracitis Turner, 1902
 Elaphristis leucochorda Turner, 1902
 Elaphristis melanica Turner, 1902
 Elaphristis psoloessa Turner, 1909

References

Hypeninae
Moth genera